The 6th annual Venice International Film Festival was held between 8 and 31 August 1938. The festival screened a French cinema retrospective, spanning works from 1891 to 1933.

Jury
 Giuseppe Volpi di Misurata (president) (Italy)
 Olaf Andersson (Sweden)
 Luigi Freddi (Italy)
 Miloš Havel (Czechoslovakia)
 Neville Kearney (UK)
 René Jeanne (France)
 Oswald Lehnich (Germany)
 Antonio Maraini (Italy)
 Humberto Mauro (Brazil)
 Edmond Moreau (Switzerland)
 Eitel Monaco (Italy)
 Ryszard Ordynski (Poland)
 Giacomo Paolucci de Calboli Barone (Italy)
 Alfonso Rivas Bustamante (Mexico)
 Harold Smith (USA)
 Junzo Sato (Japan)
 F. L. Theron (South Africa)
 Carl Vincent (Belgium)
 Louis Villani (Hungary)

In-Competition films
 The Adventures of Tom Sawyer by Norman Taurog
 The Drum by Zoltán Korda
 Gonin no Sekkohei by Tomotaka Tasaka
 Heimat by Carl Froelich
 Jezebel by William Wyler
 Luciano Serra pilota by Goffredo Alessandrini
 Marie Antoinette by W. S. Van Dyke
 Olympia 1. Teil - Fest der Völker and Olympia 2. Teil - Fest der Schönheit by Leni Riefenstahl
 Prison sans barreaux by Léonide Moguy
 Pygmalion by Anthony Asquith, Leslie Howard
 Snow White and the Seven Dwarfs by Walt Disney, Wilfred Jackson, Ben Sharpsteen, David Hand

Awards
 Best Film:
 Luciano Serra pilota by Goffredo Alessandrini
 Olympia 1. Teil - Fest der Völker and Olympia 2. Teil - Fest der Schönheit by Leni Riefenstahl
 Volpi Cup:
 Best Actor: Leslie Howard for Pygmalion
 Best Actress: Norma Shearer for Marie Antoinette
 Special Recommendation:
 Allá en el Rancho Grande by Fernando de Fuentes
 Break the News by René Clair
 Der Mustergatte with Heinz Rühmann
 En kvinnas ansikte by Gustaf Molander
 Fahrendes Volk by Jacques Feyder
 Geniusz sceny by Ludwik Solski
 Hanno rapito un uomo by Gennaro Righelli
 Jezebel by William Wyler
 Le quai des brumes by Marcel Carné
 Michelangelo by Curt Oertel
 Sotto la croce del sud by Guido Brignone
 The Rage of Paris by Henry Koster
 Thema's van de inspiratie by Charles Dekeukeleire
 Urlaub auf Ehrenwort by Karl Ritter
 Vivacious Lady by George Stevens
 Best Director: Heimat by Carl Froelich
 Medal: Natur und Technik by Ulrich K. T. Schultz
 Best Short - Fiction:
  by Giorgio Ferroni
 Karakoram by Henri de Ségogne
 Sv. Istvan (Magyar Film Iroda)
 Best Documentary:
 Nella luce di Roma (Istituto Nazionale Luce)
 The River by Pare Lorentz
 Best Educative or Scientific Film: Der Bienenstaat by Ulrich K. T. Schultz
 Special Award (The Grand Art Trophy): Snow White and the Seven Dwarfs by Walt Disney, Wilfred Jackson, Ben Sharpsteen and David Hand

References

External links

Venice Film Festival 1938 Awards on IMDb

V
Venice Film Festival
1938 film festivals
Film
August 1938 events